William Duval Cardwell (April 12, 1868 – June 27, 1954) was a Virginia politician. He represented  Hanover County in the Virginia House of Delegates, and served as that body's Speaker from 1906 until 1908.

He was the son of Richard H. Cardwell.

References

External links
 
 

Members of the Virginia House of Delegates
Speakers of the Virginia House of Delegates
1868 births
1954 deaths
People from Hanover County, Virginia
People from Madison, North Carolina